John Robert Chessher (born 21 August 1962) is an English former first-class cricketer.

Chessher was born at Banstead in August 1962. He later studied at Lincoln College, Oxford. While studying at Oxford, Chessher made four appearances in first-class cricket for Oxford University, debuting against Northamptonshire at Oxford in 1982. He made two further first-class appearances for Oxford that year, following that up with a further appearance in 1983. He scored 78 runs in his four matches at an average of 15.60 and a high score of 47.

References

External links

1962 births
Living people
People from Banstead
Alumni of Lincoln College, Oxford
English cricketers
Oxford University cricketers